Frits Schipper (24 December 1904 – 23 January 1989) was a Dutch footballer. He played in one match for the Netherlands national football team in 1928.

References

External links
 
 
 

1904 births
1989 deaths
Dutch footballers
Netherlands international footballers
Place of birth missing
Association football midfielders
Heracles Almelo players